Kenneth G. McPeek (born August 2, 1962 in Fort Chaffee, Arkansas) is an American Thoroughbred racehorse trainer.

Life and career

Kenneth G. "Kenny" McPeek was born August 2, 1962 in Fort Chaffee, Arkansas and raised in Lexington, Kentucky.  He graduated from Tates Creek High School and then the University of Kentucky with a Bachelor of Arts in Business Administration.  In 1985 McPeek received his Thoroughbred Trainer's License.

McPeek serves on the Boards of the University of Kentucky College of Agricultural Equine Program Advisory Committee, Thoroughbred Owners and Breeders Association (TOBA), and the National Horsemen's Benevolent and Protective Association (HBPA). He is a member of the New York Racing Association (NYRA) and The Cornell College of Veterinary Medicine Equine Veterinary Medical Director Search Committee.

Major horses

McPeek has trained a number of racehorses. In 2002, he won the Belmont Stakes with Sarava.  His horses won back-to-back Spinster Stakes' with Take Charge Lady in 2002 & 2003 and back-to-back Gulfstream Park Breeder's Cup Handicaps with Hard Buck (BRZ) & Prince Arch in 2004 & 2005. Other Grade 1 victories include the Florida Derby, Ashland Stakes, Blue Grass Stakes, Dixiana Breeders Futurity and the Darley Alcibiades Stakes four times in his career. He has also trained all-time leading North American money earner Curlin, Dream Empress, Tejano Run, Golden Ticket, Harlan's Holiday, Hard Buck (BRZ), Java's War, Pure Fun, Repent, Take Charge Lady, Salty Strike, Sweet Talker, Leah's Secret, She's A Devil Due, Wild Desert, Einstein, Prince Arch, Noble's Promise, Kathmanblu, Rogue Romance, Daddys Lil Darling, Eskimo Kisses, Signalman, Restless Rider, Swiss Skydiver, Simply Ravishing, King Fury, Crazy Beautiful, Tiz a Bomb, Rattle N Roll, Dash Attack, Butterbean and Classic Causeway among others.

McPeek has won more than 226 stakes in his career, with 97 of them graded. Through November 27, 2021, he has 1,815 career wins with earnings of more than $94Million.

McPeek currently races primarily at Keeneland, Churchill Downs, Gulfstream Park and Saratoga, as well as keeping a division at his Magdalena Farm in Lexington.

Graded Stakes Wins

Training facilities
In 2006, McPeek purchased a portion of the former Pillar Stud Farm, which is owned by William duPont III and formerly part of his mass landholdings prior to financial difficulties & bad investments in the 1990s causing him to sell off much of assets, a 115-acre farm, in Lexington, Kentucky which he renamed Magdalena Farm in honor of Magdalena Weber Shely (b. 6/2/1793), the original Matriarch of the land.

The office at Magdalena Farm is also the home base for McPeek Racing, Magdalena Racing Partnerships, and Horse Races Now, the comprehensive horse racing APP. Currently, the farm has over 150 horses that are either racing, training, or being broken to saddle. The farm also handles mares and foals, as well as layups, thereby covering all stages of a horse's career.

McPeek purchased Silverleaf Training Center in Ocala, Florida, in 2019. Formerly the Padua Farm Training Center, the property includes a six furlong training track, four 24-stall barns, four paddocks, 20 stall/turnout paddocks, six covered round pens, and a five stall quarantine barn.

When horses are purchased as yearlings, they are taken to Magdalena Farm in Lexington. As they mature into two-year-olds, they are transferred to our Silverleaf Training Center in Ocala to be saddle broken, started under tack, and trained to use the starting gate. As Kenny thinks each horse is ready to compete, he moves them to finish their training at a race track.

McPeek has made improvements to Silverleaf Training Center that directly benefit the two-year-olds' training such as having the track graded and adding a fully operational starting gate. New fencing and paddocks were also added.

The McPeek Silverleaf Team includes Lead Assistant Trainer Dominic Brennan, Assistant Trainer retired Eclipse award-winning jockey Robby Albarado, and Assistant Forman Shaun Charlton.

Mobile app
McPeek has developed a mobile app to provide comprehensive horse racing video and data for new fans and veteran horseplayers, called Horse Races Now. He reported that he came up with the idea for a horse racing app while watching CNBC's Planet of the Apps, a one-hour program that explored the explosion of mobile technology, specifically through phone applications. "During the show, I Googled 'horse racing apps' and there weren't any. I kind of politicked around and checked with some people to see if this was something that was happening. Long and short, I ended up doing it on my own because I just felt like it needed to be done."

McPeek launched Horse Races Now on March 27, 2012, and four years later, McPeek reported in a radio interview that the app had been downloaded over 500,000 times.

References

1962 births
Living people
American horse trainers
University of Kentucky alumni
Sportspeople from Fort Smith, Arkansas
Horse trainers from Lexington, Kentucky